Januaria can refer to:

Januária, Princess Imperial of Brazil, a Brazilian princess and Portuguese infanta
Saint Januaria, a martyr and companion of the African Saint Quirinus